John Badcock (4 October 1883 – 24 August 1940) was an English first-class cricketer. He was a right-handed batsman who bowled right-arm fast and made his first-class debut for Hampshire in the 1906 County Championship against Surrey.

Badcock played 63 first-class matches for Hampshire, with his debut season being his most successful with 96 wickets at a bowling average of 24.81, with seven five wicket hauls and best figures of 6/61. Indeed, it can be said that Badcock did not have a single bad season with the ball in the three seasons he represented Hampshire, taking 49 wicket at a bowling average of 26.08 in 1907 and 67 wickets at a bowling average of 26.17, with five five wicket hauls and three ten wickets in a match hauls and career best figures of 8/44 against Sussex.

Badcock's final match for Hampshire came in the 1908 County Championship against Gloucestershire at Dean Park Cricket Ground in Bournemouth. In Badcock's 63 first-class matches for the county he took 212 wickets at a bowling average of 25.53, with twelve five wicket hauls, three ten wicket hauls in a match and best figures of 8/44. Badcock was also a useful lower order batsman, scoring 1,199 runs at a batting average of 14.44, with two half centuries and a high score of 74 against Middlesex in 1907.

Badcock died at Marylebone, London on 24 August 1940. Badcock was not afforded a Wisden Obituary in the 1941 edition.

External links
John Badcock at Cricinfo
John Badcock at CricketArchive
Matches and detailed statistics for John Badcock

1883 births
1940 deaths
People from Christchurch, Dorset
Cricketers from Dorset
English cricketers
Hampshire cricketers